The Athletic Union League is an association football league featuring junior and amateur teams mainly from Northside, Dublin. The AUL currently operates thirteen divisions. Its senior division is known as the Premier A. Teams from the AUL also compete in the FAI Cup, the FAI Junior Cup and the Leinster Senior Cup. The AUL headquarters are at the AUL Complex at Clonshaugh/Swords, Dublin. The AUL is affiliated to both the Football Association of Ireland and the Leinster Football Association.

History

League of Ireland clubs
A number of current and former and League of Ireland clubs have played in the AUL at one time of another. At the end of the 1933–34 League of Ireland season, Shelbourne were suspended by the FAI and banned from playing football for one season. After completing their ban, Shelbourne spent the 1935–36 season playing in the AUL before rejoining the League of Ireland in 1936–37.  Athlone Town also played in the AUL during the 1930s. Bray Wanderers played in the AUL between 1943–44 and 1954–55 before joining the Leinster Senior League. St Francis joined the AUL in 1968 before they also joined the Leinster Senior League. In more recent seasons Frankfort, who were among the founding members of the League of Ireland, also played in the AUL.

Relationship with LSL
A promotion and relegation system operates within the AUL structure itself. However, there is no formal promotion and relegation relationship with the Leinster Senior League. However, there is a history of teams moving from the AUL to the LSL. A number of LSL clubs such as Wayside Celtic, St. Patrick's C.Y.F.C., Cherry Orchard, Tolka Rovers, Killester Utd and Portmarnock have played in the AUL before switching to the LSL. Strong AUL club Seaview Celtic later left the AUL to merge with Portmarnock. At the end of the 2013–14 season four AUL teams –  CIE Ranch, Hartstown Huntstown, Corduff, and Ballymun United – all switched from the AUL to the LSL.

Sheriff Y.C.
In the 2010s Sheriff Y.C. have emerged as one of the AUL's strongest teams. Between 2009–10 and 2014–15 they have won the Premier A title six times. This included a five in a row sequence between 2011–12 and 2014–15. During this time Sheriff were also regular winners of the two AUL league cups, the Nivea Cup and the Liddy Cup. They also won two FAI Junior Cups and two Leinster Junior Cups. In 2013 Sheriff also won the Tom Hand Memorial Cup, a new cup featuring the winners of the FAI Intermediate Cup and the winners of the FAI Junior Cup. In the final they defeated Avondale United 3–2 at Turners Cross.

2015–16 teams

References

 
7
4
Association football in Dublin (city)